Black Sun: Depression and Melancholia is a book by Julia Kristeva, published in 1989. It was translated from French to English by Leon S. Roudiez.

In his review in The New York Times, Perry Meisel called the book "an absorbing meditation on depression and melancholia".

References

External links
 Entry at Google Books
 London Review of Books

Works about melancholia
1989 non-fiction books